Vera Stepanovna Malinovskaya (Russian:Вера Степановна Малиновская) was a Russian silent film actress.

Filmography
Vsem na radost (1924)
The Stationmaster (1925) Dunya
The Marriage of the Bear (1926) as Yulka
Chuzhaya (1927) as Frosya
Man from the Restaurant (1927)
A Kiss from Mary Pickford (1927) as herself (cameo)
Ledyanoy dom (1928)
The Lame Gentleman (1928)
Kaiserjäger (1928)
Waterloo (1929) as Gräfin Tarnowska
The Favourite of Schonbrunn (1929) as Gräfin Nostiz

References

External links

Soviet silent film actresses
Russian silent film actresses
20th-century Russian actresses
1900 births
1988 deaths